Seawoods–Darave or simply Seawoods is a newly developed railway station on the Harbour line of the Mumbai Suburban Railway and is a sub-node in Nerul node. The railway station derives its name from the famous Seawoods NRI complex developed by CIDCO especially for high income and economically well to do groups. The area has developed rapidly in recent years compared to any other nodes in Navi Mumbai due to its strategic location, having Vashi, Mumbai & Thane towards its north and Ulwe, Uran, JNPT & upcoming international airport towards is south and CBD Belapur, Kharghar & Panvel towards its east. The station is located adjacent to Sector 40 & 42, few kilometers away from Seawoods NRI complex.

It's being developed as Seawoods Grand Central by Larsen & Toubro. The Seawoods Grand Central complex is set to have large office spaces, malls and an entertainment area which is likely to transform the image of the city. The entry/exit subway of the west side of the station is directly connected to Seawoods Grand Central.

Location
Seawoods is considered to be a subnode and it is located in the southern part of Nerul, near Parsik Hill. A rail-over bridge was constructed on 13 October 2011 beside Seawoods station which connects Seawoods East and West end. Nearby Sectors are sector 36, 38, 40, 42, 42A, 44, 44A, 46, 48, 48A, 50, new 50, 52, 54, 56, 58 on the west and sector 19A, 23, 25, 27 on the east.

It is directly connected to Palm Beach Road towards its south, and another major road like Sion-Panvel Highway through Amra Marg towards its north-east. The Navi Mumbai International Airport is just 3 km away from Seawoods.

Platforms 
The station has 4 platforms. Platform no. 01 and 02 has trains for going to Mumbai, Thane and Panvel and platform no. 03 and 04 connects to Ulwe/Uran node (JNPT) and the upcoming Navi Mumbai International Airport. The platforms have disabled-accessible ramps which are connected to the subway on the CSMT end, making the station fully accessible to all people. The subway on each end is connected to each other and it leads to ticket counter, rickshaw stand, car & bike parking and the Seawoods Grand Central Mall on the west side.
 01 – to /
 02 – to CSMT///
 03 – to 
 04 – to

References

External links
 Seawoods Grand Central
CST/Panvel Train timetable
http://cidcoindia.com/cidco/seawoodrail.aspx
(Pictures) Seawoods – India’s Largest Railway Station In The Making In Navi Mumbai

Railway stations in Thane district
Mumbai Suburban Railway stations
Mumbai CR railway division
Transport in Navi Mumbai